Beach volleyball competition at the 2016 Asian Beach Games was held in Da Nang, Vietnam from 25 September to 2 October 2016 at Mỹ Khê Beach.

Medalists

Medal table

Results

Men

Preliminary

Pool A

Pool B

Pool C

Pool D

Pool E

Pool F

Pool G

Pool H

Knockout round

Women

Preliminary

Pool A

Pool B

Pool C

Pool D

Knockout round

References

External links
AVC
Official website
Official Result Book – Beach Volleyball

2016 Asian Beach Games events
Asian Beach Games
2016